From tha Streets 2 tha Suites is the eighteenth studio album by American rapper Snoop Dogg. It was released on April 20, 2021 through Doggy Style Records. The album was released to celebrate 420 (cannabis culture). Production was handled by Amplified, DJ Battlecat, DJ Camper, Nottz, ProHoeZak, Rick Rock, Soopafly, Terrace Martin and The Mekanix. It features guest appearances from J-Black, ProHoeZak, Devin the Dude, Kokane, Larry June, Mozzy and Tha Eastsidaz.

Background 
Snoop Dogg announced the album on March 29, 2021, along with the video for the single "Roaches in My Ashtray", which was released on April 2. He announced the release date for the album on April 7, 2021, via Instagram.

Critical reception 

Chase McMullen of Beats Per Minute wrote: "A low-stakes, blessedly brief affair that’s all the more fun for its focus and trimmed run time, with tha Doggfather clearly seeming to have listened to shots fired at his mostly fine, yet bloated I Wanna Thank Me". Paul A. Thompson of Pitchfork said that it "reminds [him] of the simple pleasures of [Snoop Dogg's] still-virtuosic voice".

Track listing 
Track listing adapted from Apple Music.

References 

2021 albums
Snoop Dogg albums
Albums produced by Nottz
Albums produced by Soopafly
Albums produced by Rick Rock
Albums produced by Battlecat (producer)